Qin Junjie (born 1 September 1991) is a Chinese actor. He made his debut in the 2006 film Curse of the Golden Flower. He is best known for his starring roles in the TV series Noble Aspirations (2016), Legend of Dragon Pearl (2017), Peace in Palace, Peace in Chang’an, and Listening Snow Tower (2019).

Career
At the age of 15, Qin debuted as an actor in Zhang Yimou's Curse of the Golden Flower, playing the young Prince Yuan Cheng. He then starred in the Chinese adaptation of Japanese anime The Prince of Tennis, and gained increased popularity. Qin then took a break from acting as he concentrated on studies, appearing less frequently in projects.

Qin gained renewed recognition with his supporting roles in television dramas The Legend of Qin (2015), Noble Aspirations (2016) and The Glory of Tang Dynasty (2017).

In 2019, Qin starred as the male lead in the spy drama Spy Hunter, which is produced by the team behind the 2015 hit drama The Disguiser. The same year he starred in the wuxia romance drama Listening Snow Tower.

Upcoming Projects
In February 2017, filming began for the historical drama Peace in Palace, Peace in Chang’an, in which Qin portrayed the Tang emperor Li Shimin. The series has been in post-production since July 2017.

On September 22, 2020, Qin began filming historical drama The Legend of Yaoxiang. Filming was wrapped on January 9, 2021.

Filmography

Film

Television series

Discography

Awards and nominations

References

External links 
Qin Junjie on IMDb
 
 

1991 births
Living people
Chinese male film actors
Chinese male television actors
21st-century Chinese male actors
Central Academy of Drama alumni
Male actors from Fujian